The women's ski halfpipe competition of the FIS Freestyle Ski and Snowboarding World Championships 2017 was held at Sierra Nevada, Spain on March 16 (qualifying) and March 18 (finals). 
25 athletes from 12 countries competed.

Qualification
The following are the results of the qualification.

Final
The following are the results of the finals.

References

ski halfpipe, women's